Gifan may refer to:
 Gifan-e Bala
 Gifan-e Pain
 Gifan Rural District